This is a list of 191 species in Pericoma, a genus of moth flies in the family Psychodidae.

Pericoma species

 Pericoma acuminata Strobl, 1901 c g
 Pericoma affinis Krek, 1985 c g
 Pericoma agreste Quate & Quate, 1967 c g
 Pericoma alaeoensis Kaul, 1971 c g
 Pericoma alba (Sara, 1952) c g
 Pericoma albipes Tonnoir, 1953 c g
 Pericoma albitarsis (Banks, 2895) i c g
 Pericoma alfaroana (Dyar, 1926) c g
 Pericoma alhambrana Vaillant, 1978 c g
 Pericoma alticola Vaillant, 1955 c g
 Pericoma americana Kincaid, 1901 i c g
 Pericoma amplipenna (Knab, 1914) c g
 Pericoma ancyla Quate, 1955 i c g
 Pericoma anderssoni (Nielsen, 1965) c g
 Pericoma antennata Krek, 1983 g
 Pericoma arvernica Vaillant, 1978 c g
 Pericoma aterrima (Banks, 1914) i c g
 Pericoma atlantica (Satchell, 1955) c g
 Pericoma attenuata Vaillant, 1978 c g
 Pericoma balcanica Krek, 1985 c g
 Pericoma bancrofti Tonnoir, 1920 c g
 Pericoma barbarica Vaillant, 1955 c g
 Pericoma barbata Satchell, 1954 c g
 Pericoma barremica Vaillant & Withers, 1993 c g
 Pericoma bavarica Wagner, 1981 c g
 Pericoma becharreense Wagner, 1980 c g
 Pericoma bessophila Quate, 1955 i
 Pericoma bifalcata Satchell, 1950 c g
 Pericoma bilobata Satchell, 1954 c g
 Pericoma bipunctata Kincaid, 1899 i c g
 Pericoma biramus Quate, 1955 i c g
 Pericoma blandula Eaton, 1893 c g
 Pericoma bosnica Krek, 1967 c g
 Pericoma brasilensis Duckhouse, 1968 c g
 Pericoma bunae Krek, 1979 c g
 Pericoma busckana (Dyar, 1926) c g
 Pericoma calcifera Vaillant & Withers, 1993 c g
 Pericoma calcilega Feuerborn, 1923 c g
 Pericoma californica Kincaid, 1901 i c g
 Pericoma carolina Banks, 1931 i c g
 Pericoma chilensis Tonnoir, 1929 c g
 Pericoma chlifasica Vaillant & Moubayed, 1987 c g
 Pericoma clarkei Satchell, 1954 c g
 Pericoma claviatum Satchell, 1950 c g
 Pericoma coei Vaillant, 1965 c g
 Pericoma complexa Quate, 1955 i c g
 Pericoma complicata Tonnoir, 1929 c g
 Pericoma confusa Satchell, 1953 c g
 Pericoma consigilana Sara, 1953 c g
 Pericoma contigua Tonnoir, 1929 c g
 Pericoma coracina Duckhouse, 1966 c g
 Pericoma corsicana Vaillant, 1955 c g
 Pericoma crenophila Wagner & Schrankel, 2005 c g
 Pericoma deceptrix Quate & Brown, 2004 c g
 Pericoma decoricornis Tokunaga, 1961 c g
 Pericoma denticulatistylata Tokunaga & Kyoto, 1956 c g
 Pericoma diffusa Satchell, 1954 c g
 Pericoma diversa Tonnoir, 1919 c g
 Pericoma dlabolai Jezek, 1990 c g
 Pericoma drepanatum Satchell, 1950 c g
 Pericoma drepanopenis Duckhouse, 1975 c g
 Pericoma edwardsi Tonnoir, 1929 c g
 Pericoma egeica Vaillant, 1979 c g
 Pericoma equalis Tonnoir, 1934 c g
 Pericoma exquisita Eaton, 1893 g
 Pericoma exquista Eaton, 1893 c g
 Pericoma fallax Eaton, 1893 c g
 Pericoma fenestrata Tonnoir, 1929 c g
 Pericoma fluviatilis Dyar, 1926 i c g
 Pericoma fo-no Tokunaga, 1957 g
 Pericoma formosa Nielsen, 1964 c g
 Pericoma funebris Hutton, 1902 c g
 Pericoma gourlayi Satchell, 1950 c g
 Pericoma grabhamana (Dyar, 1926) c g
 Pericoma gracecica Vaillant, 1978 c g
 Pericoma graecica Vaillant, 1978 c g
 Pericoma granadica Vaillant, 1978 c g
 Pericoma hakkariae Wagner, 1986 c g
 Pericoma hamtensis Kaul, 1971 c g
 Pericoma hansoni Quate, 1996 c g
 Pericoma hespenheidei Quate, 1996 c g
 Pericoma hiera Quate, 1955 i c g
 Pericoma hygropetrica Wagner, 1993 c g
 Pericoma illustrata Tonnoir, 1953 c g
 Pericoma improvisa Wagner & Baez, 1993 c g
 Pericoma incompleta (Knab, 1914) c g
 Pericoma incrustans Vaillant, 1978 c g
 Pericoma inornata Tonnoir, 1929 c g
 Pericoma insularis Wagner & Salamanna, 1984 c g
 Pericoma intricatoria Tonnoir, 1953 c g
 Pericoma isabellae Wagner, 2005 c g
 Pericoma kabulica Wagner, 1979 c g
 Pericoma kariana Vaillant, 1978 c g
 Pericoma kincaidi Quate, 1955 i
 Pericoma kugleri Wagner, 1984 c g
 Pericoma lassenicalassenica Quate, 1955 c g
 Pericoma latina Sara, 1954 c g
 Pericoma limicola Vaillant, 1961 c g
 Pericoma litanica Vaillant & Moubayed, 1987 c g
 Pericoma ljubiliensis Krek, 1967 c g
 Pericoma lobisternum Satchell, 1950 c g
 Pericoma longicellata Tokunaga & Komyo, 1956 c g
 Pericoma longipennis Kaul, 1971 c g
 Pericoma ludificata Quate, 1955 i c g
 Pericoma maculosa Wagner, 1979 c g
 Pericoma marginalis (Banks, 1984) i c g
 Pericoma margininotata Brunetti, 1908 c g
 Pericoma maroccana Vaillant, 1955 c g
 Pericoma maurum Satchell, 1950 c g
 Pericoma melanderi Quate, 1955 i c g
 Pericoma metatarsalis Brunetti, 1911 c g
 Pericoma mixta Brunetti, 1911 c g
 Pericoma modesta Tonnoir, 1922 c g
 Pericoma mollis (Satchell, 1955) c g
 Pericoma motasi Vaillant, 1978 c g
 Pericoma multimaculata Satchell, 1950 c g
 Pericoma nemorosa Duckhouse, 1966 c g
 Pericoma neoblandula Duckhouse, 1962 c g
 Pericoma neretvana Krek, 1972 g
 Pericoma nielseni Kvifte, 2010 g
 Pericoma nigricauda (Tonnoir, 1919) c g
 Pericoma nigropunctata (Schiner, 1868) c g
 Pericoma niveopunctata Tonnoir, 1929 c g
 Pericoma notata Duckhouse, 1966 c g
 Pericoma orientalis Wagner, 1986 c g
 Pericoma ottwayensis Duckhouse, 1966 c g
 Pericoma paghmanica Wagner, 1979 c g
 Pericoma pallida Vaillant, 1978 c g
 Pericoma pallidula Tonnoir, 1929 c g
 Pericoma pannonica Szabo, 1960 c g
 Pericoma peregrinum Quate & Quate, 1967 c g
 Pericoma pericoma  i g
 Pericoma pictipennis Tonnoir, 1920 c g
 Pericoma pingarestica Vaillant, 1978 c g
 Pericoma platystyla Wagner, 1986 c g
 Pericoma pseudoalbipes Satchell, 1953 c g
 Pericoma pseudocalcilega Krek, 1972 c g
 Pericoma pseudoexquisita Tonnoir, 1940 c g
 Pericoma punctulatum Tonnoir, 1953 c g
 Pericoma pyramidon Quate & Brown, 2004 c g
 Pericoma remulum Quate & Brown, 2004 c g
 Pericoma restonicana Vaillant, 1978 c g
 Pericoma reticulatipennis Tokunaga & Komyo, 1956 c g
 Pericoma rivularis Berden, 1954 c g
 Pericoma rotundipennis Tonnoir, 1953 c g
 Pericoma salfii (Sara, 1951) c g
 Pericoma sasakawai Tokunaga et Komyo, 1955 c g
 Pericoma satchell Duckhouse, 1966 c g
 Pericoma schumanni Jezek, 1994 c g
 Pericoma scotiae (Curran, 1924) i c g
 Pericoma segregata Vaillant, 1978 c g
 Pericoma serratipenis Satchell, 1950 c g
 Pericoma servadeii Salamanna, 1982 c g
 Pericoma shikokuensis Tokunaga et Komyo, 1955 c g
 Pericoma sicula Quate, 1955 i c g
 Pericoma signata (Banks, 1901) i c g b
 Pericoma simplex Tonnoir, 1929 c g
 Pericoma simulata Duckhouse, 1966 c g
 Pericoma singularis Quate, 1962 c g
 Pericoma sinica Wagner, 2003 c g
 Pericoma sitchana Kincaid, 1899 i c g
 Pericoma slossonae (Williston, 1893) i c g
 Pericoma solangensis Kaul, 1971 c g
 Pericoma soleata (Haliday, 1856) c g
 Pericoma solitaria Wagner & Salamanna, 1984 c g
 Pericoma solitarium Satchell, 1954 c g
 Pericoma spiralifera Satchell, 1950 c g
 Pericoma squamitarsis Tonnoir, 1929 c g
 Pericoma steffani Quate & Quate, 1967 c g
 Pericoma stuckenbergi Duckhouse, 1975 c g
 Pericoma subillustrata Tonnoir, 1953 c g
 Pericoma symphylia Quate, 1999 c g
 Pericoma tasmaniae Tonnoir, 1953 c g
 Pericoma tatrica Szabo, 1960 c g
 Pericoma taurica Jezek, 1990 c g
 Pericoma tenerifensis Satchell, 1955 c g
 Pericoma tenuistylis Vaillant, 1978 c g
 Pericoma tienshanensis Jezek, 1994 c g
 Pericoma tonnoiri Vaillant, 1978 c g
 Pericoma tricolor (Knab, 1914) c g
 Pericoma trifasciata (Meigen, 1818) c g
 Pericoma triuncinatum Satchell, 1950 c g
 Pericoma truncata Kincaid, 1899 i c g
 Pericoma uniformatum Tonnoir, 1953 c g
 Pericoma usingeri Quate, 1955 i c g
 Pericoma vestita Vaillant & Withers, 1993 c g
 Pericoma viduata Tonnoir, 1929 c g
 Pericoma viperina Vaillant, 1961 c g
 Pericoma volpina Vaillant, 1978 c g
 Pericoma wirthi Quate, 1955 i
 Pericoma zumbadoi Quate, 1996 c g

Data sources: i = ITIS, c = Catalogue of Life, g = GBIF, b = Bugguide.net

References

Pericoma
Articles created by Qbugbot